The Sultan's Elephant was a show created by the Royal de Luxe theatre company, involving a huge moving mechanical elephant, a giant marionette of a girl and other associated public art installations. In French it was called La visite du sultan des Indes sur son éléphant à voyager dans le temps (literally, "Visit from the Sultan of the Indies on His Time-Travelling Elephant"). The show was commissioned to commemorate the centenary of Jules Verne's death, by the two French cities of Nantes and Amiens, funded by a special grant from the French Ministry of Culture and Communication. The show was performed at various locations around the world between 2005 and 2006.

Design and construction
The elephant was designed by François Delarozière. It was made mostly of wood, and was operated by 22 'manipulateurs' using a mixture of hydraulics and motors. It weighed 42 tons, as much as seven African elephants.

[With] hundreds of moving parts and scores of pumping pistons (22 in the trunk alone), the elephant appealed to the same part of the British psyche that admires Heath Robinson contraptions and reveres eccentric inventors. More than 56 square metres of reclaimed poplar was combined with steel ribs to create the elephant's sturdy skeleton. The attention to detail was extraordinary, from the flapping leather ears and deep wrinkles around the eyes to the puffs of dust sent up by its plodding feet, and the snaking, reticulated trunk.

The elephant no longer exists: Helen Marriage of Artichoke, the company that produced the London performance, said "Royal de Luxe were so fed up with being invited all over the world to perform The Sultan's Elephant, they just destroyed it."

A non-exact replica, Le Grand Eléphant (The Great Elephant) was built in Nantes (France) in 2007, as part of the Machines of the Isle of Nantes permanent exhibition. It is 20 feet tall.

Performances

Nantes and Amiens
The show was first performed in the French cities of Amiens, from 16–19 June 2005 and Nantes, from 19–22 May 2005.

London
The Sultan's Elephant show was performed in London from 4–7 May 2006.  The show started with a rocket "crashing" in Waterloo Place on Thursday May 4, smashing up the tarmac, with smoke coming out from the bottom.

On Friday, the elephant arrived, along with the Sultan. An oversize marionette emerged from the rocket—this was the girl from the Sultan's dreams. The girl met up with the elephant. Friday evening the elephant wandered round St. James's, while the girl went on a trip around London on an opentop AEC Routemaster bus.

On Saturday, the elephant walked to Trafalgar Square, where it rested over lunch. Then the girl marionette was lifted by a crane onto the elephant's trunk, and was carried on 'Grand Parade' back to Horseguards Parade, with the 'sultan' sightseeing with a troop of dancers on top of the elephant.

The girl has a needle and thread, and likes to sew things, including a series of cars that were 'sewn' to the tarmac.

On Sunday, the show finished with a Grand Finale, in which the girl climbed into the rocket, which then 'took off'. This involved the rocket firing, with smoke and flames coming out of the bottom. The rocket didn't go anywhere, but when the top was removed from the rocket, by a crane, the girl had disappeared. She had travelled in time.

Whilst in London, the elephant and the girl were stored at the Battersea Power Station, and were transported to the various sites in the early hours of the morning with a police escort. Many lampposts and traffic lights were removed to allow the elephant through. The police, who were more used to escorting large steel items overnight, were reported to have had fun with the event by making up explanations to members of the public. Between the performance days both the elephant and the girl were left sleeping at Horseguards Parade. After the performance the elephant was once again transported in the early hours of the morning back to Battersea Power Station. The return trip took longer than expected as some of the street furniture had been put back in place too early.  The event, the biggest piece of free theatre ever staged in London, with an audience of a million people, was brought to England by production company Artichoke, who were also responsible for bringing the giant mechanical spider La Princesse to Liverpool in September 2008.

Antwerp
The Sultan's Elephant show was performed in Antwerp, Belgium, 7–9 July 2006. Besides the elephant, the rocket and the small giant, there was also a carousel with fantasy vehicles.

Calais and Le Havre
Performed in the French cities of Calais 28 September–1 October 2006 and Le Havre 26–29 October 2006.

Associated performances
The giant girl performed alone, without the elephant, in Santiago, Chile 25–28 January 2007 and in Reykjavík, Iceland, from 9–12 May 2007.

References

Related links

London
 Official Site
 BBC report 4 May 2006
 BBC report 5 May 2006
 BBC report 6 May 2006
 BBC report 7 May 2006
 BBC photographs 5 May 2006
 BBC photographs 7 May 2006
 BBC video 5 May 2006
 The Observer review by Susannah Clapp
 The Guardian comment by Catherine Bennett
 The Guardian review by Emma Brockes
 The Guardian report by Lynn Gardner
 The Independent on Sunday review by Howard Jacobson
Antwerp
 BBC video 10 July 2006
Calais and Le Havre
 The Sultan's Elephant in Le Havre on October 2006. Pictures & videos

Theatre in France
Robots of France
Performing arts in the United Kingdom
Elephants in art